Ernestynów may refer to the following places in Poland:
Ernestynów, Lower Silesian Voivodeship (south-west Poland)
Ernestynów, Łódź Voivodeship (central Poland)
Ernestynów, Lublin Voivodeship (east Poland)